The Ohio State University, commonly called Ohio State or OSU, is a public land-grant research university in Columbus, Ohio. A member of the University System of Ohio, Ohio State was founded in 1870 as the state's land-grant university and the ninth university in Ohio with the Morrill Act of 1862. Ohio State was originally known as the Ohio Agricultural and Mechanical College and focused on various agricultural and mechanical disciplines, but it developed into a comprehensive university under the direction of then-Governor and later U.S. president Rutherford B. Hayes, and in 1878, the Ohio General Assembly passed a law changing the name to "the Ohio State University" and broadening the scope of the university. Admission standards tightened and became greatly more selective throughout the 2000s and 2010s.

A member of the Association of American Universities, Ohio State is a leading producer of Fulbright Scholars, and is the only school in North America that offers an ABET-accredited undergraduate degree in welding engineering. The university's endowment of $7.0 billion in 2022 is among the largest in the world. Past and present alumni and faculty include five Nobel Prize laureates, nine Rhodes Scholars, seven Churchill Scholars, one Fields Medalist, seven Pulitzer Prize winners, 64 Goldwater scholars, seven U.S. Senators, 15 U.S. Representatives, and 108 Olympic medalists. Ohio State's faculty currently includes 21 members of the National Academy of Sciences or National Academy of Engineering, four members of the Institute of Medicine and 177 elected fellows of the American Association for the Advancement of Science. Each year since 2002, Ohio State has either led or been second among all American universities in the number of their faculty members elected as fellows to the AAAS. It is classified among "R1: Doctoral Universities – Very high research activity".  Ohio State has the most students in the 95th percentile or above on standardized testing of any public university in the United States.

The university has an extensive student life program, with over 1,000 student organizations; intercollegiate, club and recreational sports programs; student media organizations and publications, fraternities and sororities; and three student governments. Its athletic teams compete in Division I of the NCAA and are known as the Ohio State Buckeyes, and it's a member of the Big Ten Conference for the majority of its sports. The school's football program has had great success and is one of the major programs of college football; their rivalry against the University of Michigan has been termed as one of the greatest in North American sports.  Ohio State's football program is valued at $1.5 billion, the highest valuation of any such program in the country. The main campus in Columbus has grown into the third-largest university campus by enrollment in the United States, with nearly 50,000 undergraduate students and nearly 15,000 graduate students.

History

Founding and early years (1870–1899) 

The proposal of a manufacturing and agriculture university in central Ohio was initially met in the 1870s with hostility from the state's agricultural interests and competition for resources from Ohio University, which was chartered by the Northwest Ordinance and Miami University.

Championed by the Republican governor Rutherford B. Hayes, the Ohio State University was founded in 1870 as a land-grant university under the Morrill Act of 1862 as the Ohio Agricultural and Mechanical College.

The school was originally within a farming community on the northern edge of Columbus. While some interests in the state had hoped the new university would focus on matriculating students of various agricultural and mechanical disciplines, Hayes manipulated both the university's location and its initial board of trustees towards a more comprehensive educational mission. The university opened its doors to 24 students on September 17, 1873. In 1878, the first class of six men graduated. The first woman graduated the following year. Also in 1878, the Ohio legislature recognized an expanded scope for the university by changing its name to "the Ohio State University." The definite article "the" is part of Ohio State's legal name; since at least the 1990s, Ohio State alumni – especially NFL players – have emphasized the "the" when referring to their school ("the Ohio State University").

Ohio State began accepting graduate students in the 1880s, and in 1891, the school saw the founding of its law school, Moritz College of Law. It would later acquire colleges of medicine, dentistry, optometry, veterinary medicine, commerce and journalism in subsequent years.

Growth and prominence (1900–1980) 

In 1906, Ohio State President William Oxley Thompson, along with the university's supporters in the state legislature, put forth the Lybarger Bill with the aim of shifting virtually all higher education support to the continued development of Ohio State while funding only the "normal school" functions of the state's other public universities. Although the Lybarger Bill failed narrowly to gain passage, in its place the Eagleson Bill was passed as a compromise, which determined that all doctoral education and research functions would be the role of Ohio State, and that Miami University and Ohio University would not offer instruction beyond the master's degree level – an agreement that would remain in place until the 1950s. In 1916, Ohio State was elected into membership in the Association of American Universities.

With the onset of the Great Depression, Ohio State would face many of the challenges affecting universities throughout America as budget support was slashed, and students without the means of paying tuition returned home to support families. By the mid-1930s, however, enrollment had stabilized due in large part to the role of the Federal Emergency Relief Administration and later the National Youth Administration. By the end of the decade, enrollment had still managed to grow to over 17,500. In 1934, the Ohio State Research Foundation was founded to bring in outside funding for faculty research projects. In 1938, a development office was opened to begin raising funds privately to offset reductions in state support.

In 1952, Ohio State founded the interdisciplinary Mershon Center for International Security Studies, which it still houses. The work of this program led to the United States Department of Homeland Security basing the National Academic Consortium for Homeland Security at the university in 2003.

The Ohio State University and the University of Michigan football programs participated in "The Ten Year War" between 1969 and 1978. In consistently close matches, it pitted coaches Woody Hayes of Ohio State and Bo Schembechler of Michigan against each other. This heated era led to the persistent Michigan–Ohio State football rivalry.

Modern era (1980–present) 
Ohio State had an open admissions policy until the late 1980s; particularly since the early 2000s, the college has greatly raised standards for admission, and it has been increasingly cited as one of the best public universities in the United States. As of 2021, it has by far the most students in the country in the 95th percentile or above of test-takers on the ACT and SAT of any public university. The trend particularly began under former university administrator William Kirwan in 1998, who set out to greatly increase the quality of applicants and make the university an elite academic university.

Michael V. Drake, former chancellor of the University of California, Irvine, became the 15th president of the Ohio State University on June 30, 2014. He announced on November 21, 2019, that he would retire at the end of the 2019–2020 academic year. In 2019, Ohio State filed for trademark protection of "the" when it is used to refer to Ohio State; the application was denied. On June 3, 2020, the Ohio State Board of Trustees appointed Kristina M. Johnson, the former chancellor of the State University of New York, as the 16th president of the Ohio State University. The main campus in Columbus has grown into the third-largest university campus in the United States.

On June 22, 2022, the United States Patent and Trademark Office granted the university a trademark on the word "the" in relation to clothing, such as T-shirts, baseball caps and hats distributed and/or sold through athletic or collegiate channels. Ohio State and its fans, in particular those of its athletics program, frequently emphasizes the word "THE" when referring to the school.

2016 terrorist attack 

In an attack against the campus on November 28, 2016, a fluorine leak was called in for a laboratory building, and as fire trucks began to depart, Abdul Razak Ali Artan drove into the crowd, then emerged and began stabbing those nearby. The attack was stopped in under two minutes by OSU Police Officer Alan Horujko, who witnessed the attack after responding to the reported gas leak, and shot and killed Artan. Ten people were transported to local hospitals, and one suspect was killed. Local law enforcement and the FBI launched an investigation, which determined that Artan was inspired by terrorist propaganda from the Islamic State and radical Muslim cleric Anwar al-Awlaki.

Campus

The original campus was laid out in the English country style with University Hall overlooking what would become the Oval. From 1905 to 1913, the Olmsted Brothers, who had designed New York City's Central Park, were contracted as architectural consultants. Under their leadership, a more formal landscape plan was created with its center axis through the Oval. This axis shifted the university's street grid 12.25 degrees from the City of Columbus' street grid. Construction of the main library in 1915 reinforced this grid shift.

Four buildings are listed on the National Register of Historic Places: Hale Hall (originally Enarson Hall), Hayes Hall, Ohio Stadium and Orton Hall. Unlike earlier public universities such as Ohio University and Miami University, whose campuses have a consistent architectural style, the Ohio State campus is a mix of traditional, modern and postmodern styles. The William Oxley Thompson Memorial Library, anchoring the Oval's western end, is Ohio State library's main branch and largest repository. The Thompson Library was designed in 1913 by the Boston firm of Allen and Collens in the Italianate Renaissance Revival style, and its placement on the Oval was suggested by the Olmsted Brothers. In 2006, the Thompson Library began a $100 million renovation to maintain the building's classical Italian Renaissance architecture.

Ohio State operates North America's 18th-largest university research library with a combined collection of over 5.8 million volumes. Additionally, the libraries regularly receive about 35,000 serial titles. Its recent acquisitions were 16th among university research libraries in North America. Along with 21 libraries on its Columbus campus, the university has eight branches at off-campus research facilities and regional campuses, and a book storage depository near campus. In all, the Ohio State library system encompasses 55 branches and specialty collections. Some more significant collections include the Byrd Polar Research Center Archival Program, which has the archives of Admiral Richard E. Byrd and other polar research materials; the Hilandar Research Library, which has the world's largest collection of medieval Slavic manuscripts on microform; the Ohio State Cartoon Library & Museum, the world's largest repository of original cartoons; the Lawrence and Lee Theatre Research Institute; and the archives of Senator John Glenn.

Anchoring the traditional campus gateway at the eastern end of the Oval is the 1989 Wexner Center for the Arts. Designed by architects Peter Eisenman of New York and Richard Trott of Columbus, the center was funded in large part by Ohio State alumnus Leslie Wexner's gift of $25 million in the 1980s. The center was founded to encompass all aspects of visual and performing arts with a focus on new commissions and artist residencies. Part of its design was to pay tribute to the armory that formerly had the same location. Its groundbreaking deconstructivist architecture has resulted in it being lauded as one of the most important buildings of its generation. Its design has also been criticized as proving less than ideal for many of the art installations it has attempted to display. The centerpiece of the Wexner Center's permanent collection is Picasso's Nude on a Black Armchair, which was purchased by alumnus Leslie Wexner at auction for $45 million.

To the south of the Oval is another, somewhat smaller expanse of green space commonly referred to as the South Oval. At its eastern end, it is anchored by the Ohio Union. To the west are Hale Hall, the Kuhn Honors House, Browning Amphitheatre (a traditional stone Greek theatre) and Mirror Lake.

Knowlton Hall, dedicated in October 2004, is at the corner of West Woodruff Avenue and Tuttle Park Place, next to Ohio Stadium. Knowlton Hall along with the Fisher College of Business and Hitchcock Hall form an academic nucleus in the northwestern corner of North campus. Knowlton Hall was designed by Atlanta-based Mack Scogin Merrill Elam along with WSA Studio from Columbus. The Hall is home to the KSA Café, the disciplines of Architecture, Landscape Architecture, City and Regional Planning, and about 550 undergraduate and graduate students. Knowlton Hall stands out from the general reddish-brown brick of Ohio State's campus with distinctive white marble tiles that cover the building's exterior. This unique wall cladding was requested by Austin E. Knowlton, the namesake of and main patron to the creation of Knowlton Hall. Knowlton also requested that five white marble columns be erected on the site, each column representing one of the classical orders of Architecture.

The Ohio State College of Medicine is on the southern edge of the central campus. It is home to the James Cancer Hospital, a cancer research institute and one of the National Cancer Institute's 41 comprehensive cancer centers, along with the Richard M. Ross Heart Hospital, a research institute for cardiovascular disease.

The campus is served by the Campus Area Bus Service.

Regional campuses
The university also operates regional campuses in five areas:

 Ohio State University at Lima – Lima, Ohio, established in 1960
 Ohio State University at Mansfield – Mansfield, Ohio, established in 1958
 Ohio State University at Marion – Marion, Ohio, established in 1957
 Ohio State University at Newark – Newark, Ohio, established in 1957
 Ohio State University Agricultural Technical Institute (ATI) – Wooster, Ohio, established in 1969

Academics

Rankings and recognition

Ohio State's political science department and faculty have greatly contributed to the construction and development of the constructivist and realist schools of international relations; a 2004 LSE study ranked the program as first among public institutions and fourth overall in the world. 

The Public Ivies: America's Flagship Public Universities (2000) by Howard and Matthew Greene listed Ohio State as one of a select number of public universities offering the highest educational quality. In its 2021 edition, U.S. News & World Report ranked Ohio State as tied for the 17th-best public university in the United States, and tied for 53rd among all national universities. They ranked the college's political science, audiology, sociology, speech–language pathology, finance, accounting, public affairs, nursing, social work, healthcare administration and pharmacy programs as among the top 20 programs in the country. The Academic Ranking of World Universities placed Ohio State 42–56 nationally and 101–150 globally for 2020. In its 2021 rankings, Times Higher Education World University Rankings ranked it tied for 80th in the world. In 2021, QS World University Rankings ranked the university 108th in the world. The Washington Monthly college rankings, which seek to evaluate colleges' contributions to American society based on factors of social mobility, research and service to the country by their graduates, placed Ohio State 98th among national universities in 2020.

In 1916, Ohio State became the first university in Ohio to be extended membership into the Association of American Universities, and remains the only public university in Ohio among the organization's 60 members. Ohio State is also the only public university in Ohio to be classified among "R1: Doctoral Universities – Highest Research Activity" and have its undergraduate admissions classified as "more selective."

Ohio State's political science program is ranked among the top programs globally. Considered to be one of the leading departments in the United States, it has played a particularly significant role in the construction and development of the constructivist and realist schools of international relations. Notable political scientists who have worked at the university include Alexander Wendt, John Mueller, Randall Schweller, Gene Sharp and Herb Asher. In 2004, it was ranked as first among public institutions and fourth overall in the world by British political scientist Simon Hix at the London School of Economics and Political Science, while a 2007 study in the academic journal PS: Political Science & Politics ranked it ninth in the United States. It is a leading producer of Fulbright Scholars.

Bloomberg Businessweek ranked the undergraduate business program at Ohio State's Fisher College of Business as the 14th best in the nation in its 2016 rankings. U.S. News & World Report ranks the MBA program tied for 30th in America. Fisher's Executive MBA program was ranked third nationally for return on investment by The Wall Street Journal in 2008, citing a 170 percent return on an average of $66,900 invested in tuition and expenses during the 18-month program.

The Ohio State linguistics department was recently ranked among the top 10 programs nationally, and top 20 internationally by QS World University Rankings.

The college is the only school in North America that offers an ABET-accredited welding engineering undergraduate degree.

Research

Ohio State's research expenditures for the 2019 fiscal year were $968.3 million. The university is among the top 12 U.S. public research universities and third among all universities in industry-sponsored research (National Science Foundation).
 It is also named as one of the most innovative universities in the nation (U.S. News & World Report) and in the world (Reuters). In a 2007 report released by the National Science Foundation, Ohio State's research expenditures for 2006 were $652 million, placing it seventh among public universities and 11th overall, also ranking third among all American universities for private industry-sponsored research. Research expenditures at Ohio State were $864 million in 2017. In 2006, Ohio State announced it would designate at least $110 million of its research efforts toward what it termed "fundamental concerns" such as research toward a cure for cancer, renewable energy sources and sustainable drinking water supplies. In 2021, President Kristina M. Johnson announced the university would invest at least $750 million over the next 10 years toward research and researchers. This was announced in conjunction with Ohio State's new Innovation District, which will be an interdisciplinary research facility and act as a hub for healthcare and technology research, serving Ohio State faculty and students as well as public and private partners. Construction is expected to be completed in 2023.

Research facilities include Aeronautical/Astronautical Research Laboratory, Byrd Polar Research Center, Center for Automotive Research (OSU CAR), Chadwick Arboretum, Biomedical Research Tower, Biological Sciences Building, CDME, Comprehensive Cancer Center, David Heart and Lung Research Institute, Electroscience Laboratory, Large Binocular Telescope (LBT, originally named the Columbus Project), Mershon Center for International Security Studies, Museum of Biological Diversity, National Center for the Middle Market, Stone Laboratory on Gibraltar Island, OH, Center for Urban and Regional Analysis and Ohio Agricultural Research and Development Center.

Admissions and tuition

Undergraduate

Ohio State is considered a highly selective public university. Undergraduate admissions selectivity to Ohio State is rated as 91/99 by The Princeton Review (meaning "highly selective") and "more selective" by U.S. News & World Report; according to the data, it's the most selective for any public university in the state of Ohio. The New York Times classifies Ohio State as a "highly selective public college."

For the Class of 2025 (enrolled fall 2021), Ohio State received 58,180 applications and accepted 33,269 (57.2%). Of those accepted, 8,423 enrolled, a yield rate (the percentage of accepted students who choose to attend the university) of 25.3%. OSU's freshman retention rate is 93.9%, with 88% going on to graduate within six years.

Of the 21% of the incoming freshman class who submitted SAT scores; the middle 50 percent Composite scores were 1260–1420. Of the 64% of enrolled freshmen in 2021 who submitted ACT scores; the middle 50 percent Composite score was between 26 and 32. In the 2020–2021 academic year, 26 freshman students were National Merit Scholars.

Tuition and fees for full-time, Ohio residents enrolled at the Columbus campus for the 2014–2015 academic year were $10,037. For the 2006–2007 academic year, tuition at Ohio State for Ohio residents placed it as the fifth-most expensive public university and slightly beneath the weighted average tuition of $8,553 among Ohio's thirteen public four-year universities.

Honors programs

Ohio State offers two distinct honors programs for high-ability undergraduates: Honors and Scholars. The Honors program is open to students in all majors. The Scholars program is centered on 13 specific programs such as "Architecture Scholars," "Media, Marketing, and Communications Scholars," "Biological Sciences Scholars," "International Affairs Scholars," "Business Scholars" and "Politics, Society and Law Scholars." Students in the Scholars program are expected to live and take select classes with other members of the program. Additionally, Ohio State offers the Honors Collegium with membership extended to 10 incoming freshmen and following the spring of a student's first or second year to the university's top undergraduates. Collegium students try to compete for internships, graduate schools and nationally competitive awards, such as the Marshall, Rhodes or Truman Scholarships.

Ohio State also administers two large-scale scholarship programs to ensure access to the university to high-ability students from low-income or traditionally underrepresented groups. The first, the Young Scholars Program, was initiated in 1988. One hundred and twenty promising minority students from Ohio's nine largest urban public school districts are selected prior to entering high school. The program offers a series of academic camps each summer and counseling throughout the students' high school careers. Upon completion of the program, which also mandates a college preparatory curriculum and minimum grade point average, the students are guaranteed admission to Ohio State as well as any need-based financial aid. The Land Grant Scholarship was initiated in 2005. This program seeks to ensure access to Ohio State to high-ability students from low-income backgrounds. Ohio State has committed to offering a full-ride scholarship each academic year to at least one student from each of Ohio's 88 counties.

Ohio State maintains an honors center in the Kuhn Honors & Scholars House, which served as the university president's residence until 1972. Three residence halls are designated all or in part as honors residences: Bradley Hall, Lincoln Tower and Taylor Tower.

Endowment and fundraising
Ohio State was among the first group of four public universities to raise a $1 billion endowment when it passed the $1 billion mark in 1999. At the end of 2005, Ohio State's endowment stood at $1.73 billion, ranking it seventh among public universities and 27th among all American universities. In June 2006, the endowment passed the $2 billion mark.

In recent decades – and in response to continually shrinking state funding – Ohio State has conducted two significant multi-year fundraising campaigns. The first concluded in 1987 and raised $460 million – a record at the time for a public university. The "Affirm Thy Friendship Campaign" took place between 1995 and 2000. With an initial goal of raising $850 million, the campaign's final tally was $1.23 billion, placing Ohio State among the small group of public universities to have successfully conducted a $1 billion campaign. At his welcoming ceremony, returning President E. Gordon Gee announced in the fall of 2007 that Ohio State would launch a $2.5 billion fundraising campaign. In 2019, celebrating the university's 150th year, President Michael V. Drake announced the "Time and Change Campaign" with a goal of raising $4.5 billion from 1 million individual donors.

Student life

The Office of Student Life has partnership affiliations with the Schottenstein Center, the Blackwell Inn and the Drake Events Center. Services supporting student wellness include the Wilce Student Health Center – named for university physician John Wilce – the Mary A. Daniels Student Wellness Center and the Counseling and Consultation Service.

The RPAC is the main recreational facility on campus. The Wellness Center within the RPAC offers services such as nutrition counseling, financial coaching, HIV and STI testing, sexual assault services, and alcohol and other drug education.

A team of engineering students from the university's "Center for Automotive Research-Intelligent Transportation" (CAR-IT) designed, built and managed the vehicle. In 2007, Buckeye Bullet 2 was launched. This follow-up effort was a collaboration between Ohio State engineering students and engineers from the Ford Motor Company and will seek to break the land speed record for hydrogen cell powered vehicles.

Diversity

The Advocate College Guide for LGBT Students lists Ohio State as one of the 20 best campuses in America for LGBT students.

The Morrill Scholarship Program (MSP) is Ohio State's premier diversity/merit scholarship program, rewarding academically talented students who are actively engaged in diversity-based leadership, service and social justice activities. MSP seeks academically talented high school seniors who will contribute to campus diversity actively engage as advocates and champions of diversity, inclusion, social justice and academic excellence on campus. There are three scholarship levels: prominence, excellence and distinction.

The graduation rate of Black males at the Ohio State University is higher than that of other Big Ten Schools. For the men who participate in the early-arrival programs, like the Bell National Resource Center's Early Arrival Program, the freshman-to-sophomore retention rate is higher than that of the entire university with 95% matriculating to their second year.

Sexual harassment handling 

In June 2018, Ohio State dissolved its Sexual Civility and Empowerment unit and eliminated four positions in the unit due to concerns about mismanagement and a lack of support for survivors of sexual assault. This occurred after the unit was suspended in February 2018 and following an external review. The Columbus Dispatch and the school newspaper, The Lantern, reported that "[SCE] failed to properly report students' sexual-assault complaints" and that some victims were told that they were lying,' 'delusional,' 'suffering from mental illness,' 'have an active imagination,' that they 'didn't understand their own experience' and also 'fabricated their story.'" With help from the Philadelphia law firm Cozen O'Connor, the university will be creating a new framework to handle sexual assault cases and reevaluating its Title IX program.

On July 20, 2018, BBC News reported that over 100 male students, including athletes from 14 sports, had reported sexual misconduct by a deceased university team physician, Richard Strauss. The reports dated back to 1978 and included claims that he groped and took nude photographs of his patients. Four former wrestlers filed a lawsuit against Ohio State for ignoring complaints of "rampant sexual misconduct" by Strauss. U.S. representative Jim Jordan was named in the lawsuit and has since denied the former wrestlers' claims that he knew about the abuse while he was an assistant coach for eight years at the university. In May 2020, the university entered into a settlement and agreed to pay $40.9 million to the sexual abuse survivors.

Activities and organizations

The Ohio Union was the first student union built by an American public university. It's dedicated to the enrichment of the student experience, on and off the university campus. The first Ohio Union, on the south edge of the South Oval, was constructed in 1909 and was later renamed Enarson Hall. The second Ohio Union was completed in 1950 and was prominently along High Street, southeast of the Oval. It was a center of student life for more than 50 years, providing facilities for student activities, organizations and events, and serving as an important meeting place for campus and community interaction. The union also housed many student services and programs, along with dining and recreational facilities. The second Ohio Union was demolished in February 2007 to make way for the new Ohio Union, which was finished in 2010. During this time, student activities were relocated to Ohio Stadium and other academic buildings.

Student organizations
Student organizations at Ohio State provide students with opportunities to get involved in a wide variety of interest areas including academic, social, religious, artistic, service-based, diversity and many more.
There are over 1,000 registered student organizations that involve many thousands of students. The university's forensics team has won the state National Forensics Association tournament several times.

Block "O" is currently the largest student-run organization on the campus of Ohio State. With over 2,400 annual members, Block "O" serves as the official student cheering section at athletic events for the university. According to the Student Organization Office in the Ohio Union, Agricultural Education Society is the oldest student organization on campus. The Men's Glee Club often disputes the claim, but after consultation with Ohio Union Staff, Agricultural Education Society was named as the university's oldest organization.

Each year, students may sign up to participate in BuckeyeThon, Ohio State's student-led philanthropy. The organization hosts events throughout the year to support the hematology/oncology/bone marrow transplant unit at Nationwide Children's Hospital in Columbus, Ohio. Although BuckeyeThon is operated entirely by student volunteers, it is embedded within Student Life and the Ohio State University Foundation. The organization receives support, advising and specialized leadership training from the university. Each February, thousands of students and community members attend BuckeyeThon's signature event, a Dance Marathon consisting of two separate 12-hour shifts. In the past 15 years, students have raised over $5 million to support treatment, research and various therapies at the hospital. Unique to BuckeyeThon is the use of an operational fund separate from the main philanthropic cancer fund. As a registered non-profit, BuckeyeThon is subject to university audit and issues gift receipts through the Foundation. An annual operational fund relies on university grants, outside sponsors and event registration fees. This allows the entirety of donations made to the cancer fund to solely support patients without hindrance from outside costs.

Ohio State has several student-managed publications and media outlets. The Makio is the official yearbook. The Makio's sales plummeted by 60% during the early 1970s; the organization went bankrupt and stopped publication during the late 1970s. The book was revived from 1985 to 1994 and again in 2000, thanks to several student organizations. The Lantern is the school's daily newspaper and has operated as a laboratory newspaper in the School of Communication (formerly the School of Journalism) since 1881. Mosaic is a literary magazine published by Ohio State, which features undergraduate fiction, poetry and art. The Sundial is a student-written and -published humor magazine. Founded in 1911, it is one of the oldest humor magazines in the country. After a 17-year hiatus in which no magazine was published, it has recently been revived – first in print form and now as an online humor blog, as well as through multiple social media outlets. Ohio State has two improvisational comedy groups – The 8th Floor Improv and Fishbowl Improv – that regularly perform long- and short-form improv around campus and across the U.S. There are two student-run radio stations on campus: AROUSE, the music station, is home to over 100 student DJs, streaming music and independent content, and Scarlet and Gray Sports Radio, which broadcasts 11 different Ohio State sports. Both stations broadcast on an internet audio stream. (No broadcast signals are available in Columbus.) Students also operate a local cable TV channel known as Buckeye TV, which airs primarily on the campus closed cable system operated by the Office of the Chief Information Officer (OCIO).

Student government
At the Ohio State University, three recognized student governments represent their constituents.

 Undergraduate Student Government (USG), which consists of elected and appointed student representatives who serve as liaisons from the undergraduate student body to university officials. USG seeks to outreach to and work for the students at Ohio State.
 Council of Graduate Students (CGS), which promotes and provides academic, administrative and social programs for the university community in general and for graduate students in particular. The council provides a forum in which the graduate student body may present, discuss and set upon issues related to its role in the academic and non-academic aspects of the university community.
 Inter-Professional Council (IPC), which is a representative body of all professional students in the colleges of dentistry, law, medicine, optometry, pharmacy and veterinary medicine. Its purpose is to act as a liaison between these students and the governing bodies of the university.

Residential life

Ohio State operates 41 on-campus residence halls divided into three geographic clusters: South Campus (site of the university's original dormitories), North Campus (largely constructed during the post-war enrollment boom) and West Campus ("The Towers"). The residence hall system has 40 smaller living and learning environments defined by social or academic considerations.

Separate housing for graduate and professional students is maintained on the Southern tier of campus within the Gateway Residential Complex and the William H. Hall Student Residential Complex. Family housing is maintained at Buckeye Village at the far northern edge of campus beyond the athletic complex.

Student Life University Housing also administers student residential housing on the OSU Newark, OSU Mansfield and OSU Agricultural Technical Institute (ATI) campuses.

The Residence Hall Advisory Council (RHAC), which is a representative body of all students living in the university's residence halls, helps evaluate and improve the living conditions of the residence halls.

North Campus: Archer House, Barrett House, Blackburn House, Bowen House, Busch House, Drackett Tower, Halloran House, Haverfield House, Houck House, Houston House, Jones Tower, Lawrence Tower, Mendoza House, Norton House, Nosker House, Raney House, Scott House, Taylor Tower, Torres House
South Campus: Baker Hall East, Baker Hall West, Bradley Hall, Canfield Hall, Fechko House, German House, Hanley House, Mack Hall, Morrison Tower, Neil Avenue, Park-Stradley Hall, Paterson Hall, Pennsylvania Place, Pomerene House, Scholars East, Scholars West, Siebert Hall, Smith-Steeb Hall, The Residence on Tenth, Worthington Building
West Campus: Lincoln Tower, Morrill Tower
Off-campus: South Campus Gateway Apartments, Veterans' House

Athletics

Ohio State's intercollegiate sports teams are called the "Buckeyes" (derived from the colloquial term for people from the state of Ohio and after the state tree, the Ohio Buckeye, Aesculus glabra), and participate in the NCAA's Division I in all sports (Division I FBS in football) and the Big Ten Conference in most sports. (The women's hockey program competes in the Western Collegiate Hockey Association.) The school colors are scarlet and gray. Brutus Buckeye is the mascot. Ohio State currently has 36 varsity teams. As of 2017, the football program is valued at $1.5 billion, the highest valuation of any such program in the country. The team's rivalry against the University of Michigan has been termed as one of the greatest in North American sports.

Ohio State is one of six universities – the University of Michigan, the University of Florida, Stanford University, UCLA and the University of California at Berkeley being the others – to have won national championships in all three major men's sports (baseball, basketball and football). Ohio State is also one of only two universities to appear in the national championship games in both football and men's basketball in the same calendar year (the other being the University of Florida). Ohio State has also won national championships in wrestling, men's volleyball, men's swimming and diving, men's outdoor track and field, men's golf, men's gymnastics, men's fencing, women's rowing, co-ed fencing and multiple synchronized swimming championships. The Ohio State equestrian team has won eight Intercollegiate Horse Show Association national championships. Since the inception of the Athletic Director's Cup, Ohio State has finished in the top 25 each year, including top-six finishes in three of the last five years. During the 2005–2006 school year, Ohio State became the first Big Ten team to win conference championships in football, men's basketball and women's basketball. Ohio State repeated the feat during the 2006–2007 school year, winning solo championships in all three sports. In 2007, Sports Illustrated nicknamed Ohio State's athletic program as being "The Program" due to the unsurpassed facilities, an unparalleled number of men's and women's sports teams and their success, and the financial support of an impressive fan base.

Outstanding sports figures that were student athletes at Ohio State include 1936 Olympics gold medalist Jesse Owens, also known as "the Buckeye Bullet" (track and field); John Havlicek, Jerry Lucas, Bobby Knight and Larry Siegfried (basketball); 2010 Olympics silver medalist Ryan Kesler (ice hockey); Katie Smith and the first three-time Player of the Year in Big Ten Basketball history Jessica Davenport (women's basketball); Frank Howard (basketball and baseball); Jack Nicklaus (golf); and Chic Harley (three-time All-American football running back). Ohio State football players have combined for seven Heisman Awards, including the only two-time winner, Archie Griffin, in 1974 and 1975, Eddie George in 1995, and most recently Troy Smith in 2006. Hall of Fame coaches at Ohio State have included Paul Brown, Woody Hayes and Jim Tressel in football, Fred Taylor in basketball, Larry Snyder in track and field, and Mike Peppe in swimming and diving. Professional football Hall of Fame players include Sid Gillman, Lou Groza, Dante Lavelli, Jim Parker, Paul Warfield, Dick LeBeau and Bill Willis.

Traditions

Fight songs and chants
The marching band has also a longstanding tradition at Ohio State. The band is famous for "Script Ohio," during which the band marches single-file through the curves of the word "Ohio," much like a pen writes the word, all while playing the French march "Le Regiment de Sambre et Meuse."

"Across the Field," Ohio State's fight song, and "Buckeye Battle Cry" are commonly played and sung at athletic events, as well as commencement and convocation exercises.

Affiliated media
Ohio State operates a public television station, WOSU-TV (virtual channel 34/DT 16, a local PBS TV station), as well as two public radio stations, WOSU-FM 89.7(NPR/BBC news/talk) and WOSA-FM 101.1 (classical, "Classical 101") in Columbus.

Notable people

Alumni
Ohio State has 580,000 living alumni around the world. Past and present students and faculty include 5 Nobel Prize laureates, nine Rhodes Scholars, seven Churchill Scholars, 64 Goldwater scholars, one Fields Medalist and seven Pulitzer Prize winners, as well as seven U.S. Senators, 15 U.S. Representatives and 104 Olympic medalists. Also included are UFC champions, Medal of Honor recipients, ambassadors, Fortune 500 CEOs and members of the Forbes 400 list of the world's wealthiest individuals. Numerous graduates have gone on to become U.S. governors, senators and members of Congress. Ohio State alumni have appeared on the cover of Time magazine 12 times, with the artwork of alumnus Roy Lichtenstein featured on an additional two Time covers. George Steinbrenner, former owner of the New York Yankees who won seven World Series with the team, earned his master's degree from Ohio State. Larry Sanger, one of the founders of Wikipedia, and Steve May, chief technology officer at Pixar, both graduated from Ohio State. Roboticist James S. Albus was named a "Hero of US Manufacturing" by Fortune magazine in 1997.

Ohio State alumni have been inducted into the Baseball Hall of Fame in Cooperstown, New York, the NFL Hall of Fame and the Basketball Hall of Fame. Its athletes have won a combined 83 Olympic medals and three times have received the Sullivan Award as the nation's top amateur athlete.

Faculty 
Ohio State's faculty currently includes 21 members of the National Academy of Sciences or National Academy of Engineering, four members of the Institute of Medicine and 177 elected fellows of the American Association for the Advancement of Science. In 2009, 17 Ohio State faculty members were elected as AAAS Fellows. Each year since 2002, Ohio State has either led or been second among all American universities in the number of their faculty members elected as fellows to the AAAS.

In surveys conducted in 2005 and 2006 by the Collaborative on Academic Careers in Higher Education (COACHE), Ohio State was rated as "exemplary" in four of the seven measured aspects of workplace satisfaction for junior faculty members at 31 universities: overall tenure practices, policy effectiveness, compensation and work-family balance.

In the last quarter century, 32 Ohio State faculty members have received the Guggenheim Fellowship, more than all other public and private Ohio universities combined. In 2008, three Ohio State faculty members were awarded Guggenheim Fellowships, placing Ohio State among the top 15 universities in the United States. Since the 2000–2001 award year, 55 Ohio State faculty members have been named as Fulbright Fellows, the most of any Ohio university.

See also
Jack Nicklaus Museum
List of buildings at Ohio State University
Ohio State University Press

Notes

References

External links

 
 
 
 

 
University
Educational institutions established in 1870
Flagship universities in the United States
Forestry education
Ohio State University, The
Midwestern Intercollegiate Volleyball Association
Optometry schools in the United States
Ohio State University, The
Universities and colleges accredited by the Higher Learning Commission